Platyptilia isodactylus (ragwort plume moth or ragwort crown-boring plume moth) is a moth of the family Pterophoridae found in China, Europe and was introduced to Australia and New Zealand for biological control. It was first described by the German entomologists, Philipp Christoph Zeller in 1852.

Description
The wingspan is 21-23 mm. The forewings are brown, the costa is anteriorly dark fuscous, whitish-sprinkled with a very ill -defined dark fuscous triangular blotch on costa beyond middle, the apex forming a distinct dot. There are faint traces of a pale subterminal line; apical 2/3 of terminal cilia white. The hindwings are dark fuscous scale-tooth moderate, in middle. The larva is pale green; dorsal line darker; subdorsal darker, whitish -edged above; lateral and spiracular faintly whitish; head and tubercles black..

Biology
Moths are on the wing in June and then again in August and September.

The larvae feed in the stems of ''Senecio aquaticus.

Distribution
It is native to central Europe, Mediterranean North Africa and southern Europe. It has also been recorded from China. It has been introduced in Australia and New Zealand as a biological control agent for ragwort.

References

External links
 Trin Wiki 
 Fact Sheet 
 Biological Control of Ragwort

isodactylus
Moths described in 1852
Moths of Africa
Moths of Australia
Moths of Asia
Moths of Europe
Taxa named by Philipp Christoph Zeller